Axel Louissaint (born 3 January 1996) is a Swiss professional basketball for Lugano Tigers of Swiss Basketball League, the top tier of basketball in Switzerland.

Professional career

Lugano Tigers (2015–2017)
Louissaint signed with the Lugano Tigers in 2015 at the age of 18. He made his first professional appearance on 14 February 2015, scoring seven points and grabbing four rebounds. Over his first two years Louissaint appeared in 58 games starting 24.

On 25 April 2017 Louissaint declared for the 2017 NBA draft, being one of 45 international players to do so.

Riviera Lakers (2017-2018)
Louissaint signed with the Vevey Riviera Basket of Championnat LNA. On week 21, he was selected for the Top 5 of the week.

Leyma Coruña (2018–2019)
On 23 July 2018 Louissaint signed with Leyma Coruña of LEB Oro.

Return to Lugano (2020–present)
After spending the 2019-20 season with several Spanish clubs, Louissaint returned to Lugano Tigers on 12 August 2020.

National team career
He has competed for Switzerland through multiple youth national teams, and participated at the 2015 FIBA Europe Under-20 Championship Division B. He was the top scorer of his team and averaged 13.1 points, 7.7 rebounds, 1.4 steals per game.

Career statistics

LNA stats

|-
| style="text-align:left;"| 2015–16
| style="text-align:left;"| Lugano Tigers
| 26 || 6 || 19.7 || .324 || .260 || .458 || 2.3 ||  .7 || .4 || .2  || 5.7 || 7.1
|-
| style="text-align:left;"| 2016–17
| style="text-align:left;"| Lugano Tigers
| 32 || 18 || 24.3 || .311 ||  .255 || .633 || 3.7 ||  1.0 || .6 || .1  || 5.9 || 7.7
|- class="sortbottom"
| align="center" colspan="2"| Career
| 58 || 24 || 21.8 || .319 || .257 || .356 || 3.0 || .8 || .5 || .1 || 5.8 || 7.3

References

1996 births
Living people
Básquet Coruña players
Swiss expatriate basketball people in Spain
Lugano Tigers players
People from Yverdon-les-Bains
Shooting guards
Small forwards
Swiss expatriate basketball people
Swiss expatriate sportspeople in Spain
Swiss men's basketball players
Vevey Riviera Basket players
Sportspeople from the canton of Vaud